The Quinnipiac River is a  long river in the New England region of the United States, located entirely in the state of Connecticut.

The river rises in West Central Connecticut from Dead Wood Swamp near the city of New Britain. It flows roughly southward to Plainville, Southington, and Cheshire, west of the city of Meriden, through Wallingford and Yalesville, North Haven, and flows into New Haven Harbor, an inlet of Long Island Sound, east of downtown New Haven.

History 

The name "Quinnipiac" comes from an Algonquian phrase meaning "long water land", and historically referred both to the river and the area around its mouth at Long Island Sound. Europeans found the river in 1614. By the early 18th century, early settlers called the Quinnipiac River the Dragon River after the seals, then referred to as “sea dragons,” that were once abundant there. Although these seals were likely harbor seals (Phoca vitulina), archaeological evidence confirms that gray seals (Halichoerus grypus), which are over twice the size of a harbor seal, also lived near the mouth of the Quinnipiac River as recently as the sixteenth century.

Watershed and course 
There are four dams, most of which are old remnants, that impede boat travel. The first dam is about 1/2 mile south of Plantsville, the second dam is at the southeast corner of Hanover Pond in South Meriden, the third dam is in northeast Yalesville, and the fourth dam is at the south end of Community Lake in Wallingford.

In April 2017, a small hydroelectric plant using a screw turbine was installed at Hannover Pond.

Paddling is a frequent recreational activity along the Quinnipiac River, especially within the tidal marsh in North Haven.  Additionally, the tidal variation extends approximately  upriver from its mouth.

Ecology and conservation 
Throughout the 19th and 20th centuries, the river suffered from severe pollution problems because of the presence of heavy industry and population centers in its watershed. The Quinnipiac was the subject of the first ever pollution control measure in the state of Connecticut. In 1886, the state legislature passed a measure prohibiting the City of Meriden from discharging raw sewage into the river. In 1891, the act resulted in the building of state's second sewage treatment plant.

Nevertheless, by 1914, the State Board of Health reported that the major fish life had largely disappeared from its mouth. The pollution has been somewhat abated by the passage of the Connecticut Clean Water Act of 1967, and by the Water Pollution Control Act of 1972, which provided the legal authority to take measures to clean up the river's watershed. The measures included the construction of advanced waste management facilities for sewage and industrial waste. Levels of copper in the river have decreased 70% since the 1980s and are now comparable to other reference streams in Connecticut. Combined sewer overflows from the City of New Haven are still regarded as a major problem for the estuary.

Recreation 
Paralleling the west bank of the Quinnipiac River through the entire length of Quinnipiac River State Park in North Haven is the Quinnipiac Trail.

Crossings

See also 

 Grannis Island
 List of rivers of Connecticut

References

External links
 Quinnipiac River Fund home page
 Connecticut Department of Environment Protection: Quinnipiac River
 Quinnipiac River Historic District, New Haven.
 Quinnipiac River Watershed Association, located on Hanover Pond, Oregon Road, City of Meriden, CT.
 Connecticut Explorer's Guide Online paddling map of the Quinnipiac River

Estuaries of Connecticut
Geography of New Haven, Connecticut
Long Island Sound
Meriden, Connecticut
North Haven, Connecticut
Rivers of Connecticut
Rivers of New Haven County, Connecticut
Southington, Connecticut
Wallingford, Connecticut